The 2017 China Open was a tennis tournament played on outdoor hard courts. It was the 19th edition of the China Open for the men (21st for the women). It was part of ATP World Tour 500 series on the 2017 ATP World Tour, and the last WTA Premier Mandatory tournament of the 2017 WTA Tour. Both the men's and the women's events were held at the National Tennis Center in Beijing, China, from October 2 to October 8, 2017.

Points and prize money

Point distribution

Prize money

ATP singles main-draw entrants

Seeds

 1 Rankings are as of September 25, 2017

Other entrants
The following players received wildcards into the singles main draw:
  Juan Martín del Potro
  Wu Di
  Zhang Ze

The following player received entry as a special exempt:
  Damir Džumhur

The following players received entry from the qualifying draw:
  Steve Darcis
  Marcel Granollers
  Malek Jaziri
  Dušan Lajović

Withdrawals
Before the tournament
  David Ferrer →replaced by  Leonardo Mayer
  Philipp Kohlschreiber →replaced by  Andrey Rublev
  Andy Murray →replaced by  Jared Donaldson
  Jo-Wilfried Tsonga →replaced by  Jan-Lennard Struff

Retirements
  Aljaž Bedene
  Steve Darcis

ATP doubles main-draw entrants

Seeds

 Rankings are as of September 25, 2017

Other entrants
The following pairs received wildcards into the doubles main draw:
  Juan Martín del Potro /  Leonardo Mayer
  Gong Maoxin /  Zhang Ze

The following pair received entry from the qualifying draw:
  Wesley Koolhof /  Artem Sitak

WTA singles main-draw entrants

Seeds
The following are the seeded players. Seedings are based on WTA rankings as of 25 September 2017. Rankings and points before are as of 2 October 2017.

Other entrants 
The following players received wildcards into the singles main draw:
  Eugenie Bouchard
  Duan Yingying
  Maria Sharapova
  Wang Yafan
  Zhu Lin

The following players received entry using a protected ranking into the singles main draw:
  Sloane Stephens

The following players received entry from the qualifying draw:
  Lara Arruabarrena
  Jennifer Brady
  Madison Brengle
  Varvara Lepchenko
  Magda Linette
  Christina McHale
  Andrea Petkovic
  Carina Witthöft

Withdrawals 
Before the tournament
  Timea Bacsinszky →replaced by  Donna Vekić
  Catherine Bellis →replaced by  Wang Qiang
  Océane Dodin →replaced by  Monica Niculescu
  Madison Keys →replaced by  Shelby Rogers
  Ana Konjuh →replaced by  Alison Riske
  Mirjana Lučić-Baroni →replaced by  Yulia Putintseva
  Lucie Šafářová →replaced by  Sorana Cîrstea
  Roberta Vinci →replaced by  Natalia Vikhlyantseva
  Serena Williams →replaced by  Alizé Cornet
  Venus Williams →replaced by  Mona Barthel

Retirements 
  Magda Linette
  Garbiñe Muguruza
  Peng Shuai
  Magdaléna Rybáriková
  CoCo Vandeweghe

WTA doubles main-draw entrants

Seeds

1 Rankings are as of September 25, 2017

Other entrants
The following pairs received wildcards into the doubles main draw:
  Han Xinyun /  Liang Chen
  Wang Qiang /  Wang Yafan

The following pair received entry as alternates:
  Lauren Davis /  Alison Riske

Withdrawals
Before the tournament
  Kristina Mladenovic

Champions

Men's singles

  Rafael Nadal def.  Nick Kyrgios, 6–2, 6–1

Women's singles

  Caroline Garcia def.  Simona Halep, 6–4, 7–6(7–3)

Men's doubles

  Henri Kontinen /  John Peers def.  John Isner /  Jack Sock, 6–3, 3–6, [10–7]

Women's doubles

  Chan Yung-jan /  Martina Hingis def.  Tímea Babos /  Andrea Hlaváčková, 6–1, 6–4

References

External links
Official Website